Ivan is a 2002 Indian Tamil language film directed, written and produced by Parthipan. The film stars him along with Meena and Soundarya The film though was a runway hit.

Plot
Jeevan (Parthiban) is a tempo driver and a socially conscious middle-aged man who wants to clean up society. His motivation is his late father (Thalaivasal Vijay) who was murdered as he tried to be a crusader. Jeevan is intelligent enough to realize that he is not a one-man-army to fight the evils and corruption in society. So what he does is to motivate the public to fight for their rights. He lives in a small place with four friends and together they do what little they can to improve the condition around. The Carnatic singer Dikshana (Soundarya) has a silent admiration for Jeevan, but it is the Telugu woman Meena Kumari (Meena) who wins him over and forces him to marriage by telling a lie that she has cancer. There are about 18 antagonists, who make their entry and exit. Thereafter, Jeevan brings them all together and each of them gets a chance to support his stand and speak on the circumstances which forced them to take to crime. Jeevan gives a long lecture and transforms them into being good citizens.

Cast

Parthiban as Jeevan
Meena as Meena Kumari
Soundarya as Dikshanya
Anandaraj as “Diesel” Raj
Nizhalgal Ravi as Kathiresan
Kitty  as Seth
Devan
FEFSI Vijayan as Police inspector
Thalaivasal Vijay as Jeevan's Father
B. V. Balaguru
Mahanadi Shankar as Rowdy
Bala Singh as Politician
S. V. Ramadas
Rowdy Rathnam
M. S. Bhaskar as Meena Kumari's father
Ganthimathi as Slum dweller
Manochithra as Dikshanya's mother
Subhashini as Meena Kumari's mother
Anuradha as Lady pimp
C. R. Saraswathi as Drug dealer
Theni Kunjarammal as Slum dweller
Vandana as Janani
Reena Reddy
Baby Prithivi as Valli
Senbhaga Muthu as Slum dweller
Singamuthu as Singamuthu
Nellai Siva as Slum dweller
Ooty Mani as Slum dweller
Kanal Kannan as Rowdy
Dubbing Venkat
Thalapathy Dinesh as Counterfeiter
Idichapuli Selvaraj as Swamy
T. P. Gajendran as Politician
Vetri Vigneshwar as Adult film producer
Benjamin
Veera Raghavan
Set Govindaraj as Slum dweller
Y. S. D. Sekhar as Slum dweller
C. Duraipandian as Lawyer
Kovai Senthil as Demonstrator
Vijay Ganesh as Ration shop worker
Raaghav as Journalist (uncredited role)
Preetha as Preetha (uncredited role)
Hemalatha as Teenage girl
Srilatha as Government employee
Abhinayashree in a special appearance
Subbudu as himself (cameo appearance)

Production
Music critic Subbudu made his cinematic debut appearing as himself.

Soundtrack
Soundtrack was composed by Ilaiyaraaja.

Awards

Won 
Tamil Nadu State Film Award for Best Actress - Meena

References

External links

2002 films
Films scored by Ilaiyaraaja
2000s Tamil-language films